Cinemala is a Malayalam television parody series that aired on Asianet.

Broadcast 
The first episode aired on Asianet, a Malayalam news television network, on 20 August 1993. It was the first show aired on Asianet. The program was broadcast in thirty-minute episodes every Sunday at 1:30 pm (IST) until it stopped airing in 2013.

History 
It started as a film-based satire, which later on began to delve into contemporary political and social issues. It focused on current events, often referencing figures such as politicians and media personalities in a satirical way. These public figures were played by mimicry artists from Malayalam television.

It was awarded a place in the Limca Book of Records as one of the longest-running TV shows. On 7 April 2013, it aired its 1,000th episode.

Cinemala 1000 
To celebrate the broadcasting of the 1,000th episode of Cinemala, Asianet conducted a mega stage show on July 31, 2013 titled CINEMA LA 1000 at Gokulam Convention Centre, Kochi, Kerala. Leading actors Dileep and Salim Kumar were honored during the occasion. Mementos were presented to all actors who had been a part of the Cinemala. The show featured comedy skits by Cinemala actors as well as performances by other actors such as Suraj Venjaramoodu, Mamukkoya, Indrans, P. Jayachandran, Usha Uthup, Sithara (singer), Shamna Kasim, Subi, and Tesni Khan.

Cast
Subi Suresh
Thesni Khan
Saju Kodiyan
Manoj Guinness
Ramesh Pisharody
Dharmajan Bolgatty
Kottayam Nazeer
Kochu Preman
Dileep
Harisree Ashokan
Salim Kumar
Tini Tom
Guinness Pakru
Suraj

References

Malayalam-language television shows
Indian comedy television series
Asianet (TV channel) original programming
1993 Indian television series debuts
2000s Indian television series
2010s Indian television series